Brachmia murinula is a moth in the family Gelechiidae. It was described by Turati in 1930. It is found in Libya.

References

Moths described in 1930
Brachmia
Moths of Africa